NGC 4452 is an edge-on lenticular galaxy that is part of the Virgo Cluster. NGC 4452 is located approximately 60 million light-years distant and is 35,000 light-years in width. This galaxy was first seen by William Herschel in 1784 with his 47 cm telescope.

NGC 4452 is so thin that it is actually difficult to determine what type of disk galaxy it is. Its lack of a visible dust lane indicates that it is a low-dust lenticular galaxy, although it is still possible that a view from on top would reveal spiral structure. The unusual stellar line segment spans about 35,000 light years from end to end. Near NGC 4452's center is a slight bulge of stars, while hundreds of background galaxies are visible far in the distance. Galaxies that appear this thin are rare mostly because the Earth must reside (nearly) in the extrapolated planes of their thin galactic disks. Galaxies that actually are this thin are relatively common – for example, the Milky Way Galaxy is thought to be about this thin.

NGC 4452 appears to be very similar to galaxy IC 335, an edge-on galaxy in Fornax Cluster, in constellation Fornax.

References

External links 
 
 An Extraordinarily Slender Galaxy – ESA/Hubble Picture of the week

Virgo Cluster
4452
Lenticular galaxies
17840315
Virgo (constellation)
041060